Destrnik is a settlement in northeastern Slovenia. It is the seat of the Municipality of Destrnik. It lies in the Slovene Hills north of Ptuj. The area is part of the traditional region of Styria. It is now included in the Drava Statistical Region.

Name
Destrnik was first attested in written sources in 1398 and 1441 as Terstenik, and as Dersternikh in 1495. The name is believed to derive from *Drstenik and, like similar names (e.g., Drstelja), is presumably based on the Slovene common noun drsten 'broken stone, rubble, scree'.

Church
The local parish church, built on the highest point in the settlement, dominates its landscape and appears in the municipal coat of arms.  It is dedicated to Saint Urban and belongs to the Roman Catholic Archdiocese of Maribor. It dates to the 16th century with 18th-century adaptations. The feast day of Saint Urban, 25 May, has also been chosen as the official municipal holiday.

References

External links
 Destrnik on Geopedia
 Destrnik municipal site

Populated places in the Municipality of Destrnik